The 2007 Dartmouth Big Green football team was an American football team that represented Dartmouth College during the 2007 NCAA Division I FCS football season. Dartmouth tied for fourth in the Ivy League. Dartmouth averaged 5,497 fans per game.

In their third consecutive year under head coach Eugene "Buddy" Teevens, his eighth year overall, the Big Green compiled a 3–7 record and were outscored 347 to 271. Jared Dowdakin, Justin Cottrell, Taylor Layman and Ian Wilson were the team captains.  

The Big Green's 3–4 conference record tied with Penn and Princeton for fourth in the Ivy League standings. Dartmouth was outscored 223 to 197 by Ivy opponents.

Dartmouth played its home games at Memorial Field on the college campus in Hanover, New Hampshire.

Schedule

References

Dartmouth
Dartmouth Big Green football seasons
Dartmouth Big Green football